Catbalogan Airport  is an airport located in Catbalogan, the capital of Samar, Philippines.  It is classified as a community airport by the Civil Aviation Authority of the Philippines (CAAP), a body of the Department of Transportation (DOTr) that is responsible for the operations of not only this airport but also other airports in the Philippines except the major international airports. Catbalogan Airport is located in Barangay Cabugawan on Buri Island, connected via land bridge of Route 675 to the coast of Barangay Silanga, Catbalogan.

Airlines and destinations

Air Juan launched commercial flights between Cebu City and Catbalogan in March 2018.

History
In 1995, the government approved 57 million pesos ($2.2 million) for building the airport - a pet project of Congressman Catalino Figueroa, a member of former president Fidel Ramos's Lakas-NUCD party.

In July 2006, Congressman Figueroa visited the Palace and requested funding for Samar roads and the Catbalogan Domestic Airport in Buri, Catbalogan. President Gloria Macapagal Arroyo granted P20-M for the initial implementation of the said airport.

In 2012, some ₱94 million were allocated but there has been no clear outcome on its implementation since the airport has not commenced commercial operations during the period. 
 
As part of the government's airport modernization program, DOTr Sec. Art Tugade visited the Catbalogan Airport in August 2017 with plans to expand it by 2018 as one of its priority projects.

See also
List of airports in the Philippines

References

External links
More photos and information on Catbalogan Airport
 

Airports in the Philippines
Buildings and structures in Catbalogan